There are several parties named People's Progressive Party:

People's Progressive Party (Anguilla)
People's Progressive Party (Gambia)
People's Progressive Party (Guyana) (and previously British Guiana)
People's Progressive Party (Malaysia)
People's Progressive Party (Nepal)
People's Progress Party (Papua New Guinea)
People's Progressive Party (Saint Lucia)
People's Progressive Party (Solomon Islands)
People's Progressive Party (Uganda)
People's Progress Party (Vanuatu)
United People's Progressive Party, Bulgaria
Croatian People's Progressive Party from the Croatian parliamentary election, 1906

See also
Progressive People's Party (disambiguation)